Edri (Hebrew: אדרי) is a surname. Notable people with the surname include:
 Amir Edri (born 1985), Israeli goalkeeper
 Avi Edri (born 1968), Israeli trade unionist
 Kfir Edri (born 1976), Israeli former footballer
 Kim Edri (born 1992), Israeli beauty queen
 Lior Edri (born 1979), Israeli rabbi and politician
 Rafael Edri (born 1937), Israeli former politician
 Shalom Edri (born 1994), Israeli footballer 
 Shimon Edri (born 1962), Israeli football manager
 Shlomi Edri (born 1982), Israeli footballer
 Shon Edri (born 2004), Israeli professional footballer  
 Yaakov Edri (born 1950), Israeli politician

Jewish surnames